Ronson may refer to:

People
 Barbara Ronson (1942–2018), British Liberal Democrat politician
 Billy Ronson (1957–2015), English footballer
 Charlotte Ronson (born 1977), English fashion designer in New York
 Gail Ronson (born 1946), British philanthropist
 Gerald Ronson (born 1939), British businessman
 Jon Ronson (born 1967), journalist, documentary filmmaker, radio presenter and author 
 Len Ronson (1936–2014), Canadian professional ice hockey winger 
 Mark Ronson (born 1975), English musician, DJ, singer, songwriter and record producer
 Mick Ronson (1946–1993), English guitarist, songwriter, multi-instrumentalist, arranger, and producer
 Peter Ronson (1934–2007), born Pétur Rögnvaldsson, Icelandic-born athlete and actor
 Samantha Ronson (born 1977), English DJ and singer-songwriter

Other uses

 M4 Sherman, American tank used during World War II allegedly nicknamed Ronson 
 Ronson (company)
 Ronson flamethrower
 Ronson system